William Davis Vincent (October 11, 1852 – February 28, 1922) was a U.S. Representative from Kansas.

Born near Dresden, Tennessee, Vincent moved with his parents to Riley County, Kansas, in 1858 and to Manhattan, Kansas, in 1864. He attended the public schools and the State agricultural college in Manhattan, Kansas. Vincent engaged in business in Manhattan 1872–1876.

He moved to Clay Center, Kansas, in 1878 and engaged in mercantile pursuits. Vincent was elected as a member of the city council in 1880. He served as member of the State board of railroad commissioners in 1893 and 1894.

Vincent was elected as a Populist to the Fifty-fifth Congress (March 4, 1897 – March 3, 1899). He engaged in the hardware business in Clay Center, Kansas, until his death in St. Louis, Missouri on February 28, 1922. He was interred in Greenwood Cemetery, Clay Center, Kansas.

References

1852 births
1922 deaths
People from Dresden, Tennessee
People's Party members of the United States House of Representatives from Kansas
People from Clay Center, Kansas
Politicians from Manhattan, Kansas
People from Riley County, Kansas
Kansas State University alumni
Businesspeople from Kansas
Kansas city council members
Kansas Populists
Members of the United States House of Representatives from Kansas